Syarhei Parsyukevich (Siarhiej Parsiukievič; born 14 May 1967, in Vitebsk) is a Belarusian small businessman who was sentenced to 2.5 years of jail and a compensation of 1.5 million Br for protesting against a decree introducing severe limitations for small and medium enterprises. His arrest became a large scandal in Belarus, Parsyukevich is considered by many, including the US Department of State to be a political prisoner.

Parsyukevich is a retired police officer who started doing his business in Viciebsk in 2004. He was leader of a union of individual businessmen of the "Smalensk market".

On 10 January, he took part in a demonstration of small and medium businesspeople in Minsk protesting against the presidential decree #760 that introduced limitations to SME's business (for instance, allowing them to hire only relatives of the business owner). On 13 January, he was arrested in Viciebsk and brought to Minsk. On the following day he was given 15 days of arrest for participating in the demonstration. During this period he went on hunger strike.

On 21 January, Syarhej Parsyukevich was probably strongly beaten up in jail by a policeman. Soon after his liberation, he was accused of having beaten up the policeman himself.

On 23 April, the next day after the final trial of Andrei Kim, another person considered as political prisoner, Parsyukevich was sentenced to 2.5 years of jail and a compensation of 1.5 Million Br. The fact that he is a former police officer is considered as a fact to threaten current policemen not loyal to the regime of president Lukashenka.

References

External links
 Political prisoner Syarhei Parsyukevich
 Vitsebsk entrepreneur Syarhei Parsyukevich is arrested for 15 days

1967 births
Living people
People from Vitebsk
Belarusian businesspeople
Belarusian prisoners and detainees